Blachman is a 2013 Danish talk show started by Thomas Blachman. The program features a woman in a bathrobe, walking into a black TV-studio, stepping into a spotlight, and getting naked in front of a male guest and Blachman himself, both sitting on a leather couch. The two men start talking about the beauty of the female body and their own roles as males.

The nude female - representing all ages and shapes - and the male guest, changes on every episode.

Episodes
There are a total of six episodes and one season of Blachman. The episodes and male guests are listed here:

Season 1:

1. Jan Sonnergaard (April 2, 2013)

2. Erik Brandt (April 9, 2013)

3. Henrik Vibskov (April 16, 2013)

4. Simon Jul (April 23, 2013)

5. Shaka Loveless (April 30, 2013)

6. Sten Hegeler (May 7, 2013)

References

External links

2013 Danish television series debuts
2013 Danish television series endings
2010s Danish television series
Danish-language television shows
DR TV original programming